The Cahawba elimia (Elimia cahawbensis) is a species of freshwater snail with an operculum, an aquatic gastropod mollusk in the family Pleuroceridae.

This species is endemic to the United States. It is named after Cahaba, Alabama and the Cahaba River.

References

Further reading 
 Lori R. Tolley-Jordan, Hayleigh Barlar, Alexander Huryn. 2008. Influence of Catchment Land Use on in Situ Growth Rates of Elimia cahawbensis (Gastropoda: Pleuroceridae) in Headwater Streams of the Cahaba River Basin, Alabama USA. The Nabs 56th Annual Meeting (25–28 May 2008).

Elimia
Endemic fauna of the United States
Gastropods described in 1841
Taxonomy articles created by Polbot
Taxa named by Isaac Lea